The Huisun Forest Recreation Area is a forest in Ren'ai Township, Nantou County, Taiwan. The forest is managed by the Department of Agriculture of National Chung Hsing University (NCHU).

Name
The name Huisun was taken from the late president of NCHU, Tang Hui-sun, who died when exploring the forest.

History
The forest was established in 1916. After the handover of Taiwan from Japan to the Republic of China, the forest was managed by the Taiwan Provincial College of Agriculture and named Nenggao Forest. In 1963, the forest was renamed to Huisun Forest.

Geology
The forest covers an area of 74.77 km2 and located at an altitude of 450–2,419 meters above sea level. It consists of 500 meters deep canyons and waterfalls. It also features six hiking trails.

Transportation
The forest is accessible by bus from Puli Township. Access by road is on Provincial Highway No. 21 at the 29km marker.

See also
 Geography of Taiwan

References

External links
 

1916 establishments in Taiwan
Forests of Taiwan
Geography of Nantou County
Tourist attractions in Nantou County